Quill or Quille is an anglicised version of the Irish surname " Ó Cuill" Coll, Coill, and O'Coill (Ó Coill), all of which mean wood, forest or shrub Hazel Tree. The Coill clan are believed to be a bardic family from Munster, particularly Kerry and Cork. The Irish surname has also been Anglicised as Woods. Notable people with the surname include:

Alf Quill, Australian athlete
Declan Quill, Irish Gaelic footballer
Eric Quill (b. 1978), American soccer player
Erin Quill, American actress
Gene Quill (1927–1988), American musician
Greg Quill, Australian musician
Jeffrey Quill (1913–1996), British aviator and author
John Quill, Irish rugby player
John Quill, pseudonym of Charles Heber Clark
Kid Quill, stage name of American musician Mitchell Quilleon Brown
Máirín Quill (b. 1936), Irish politician
Michael D. Quill Sr. (b. 1949), mayor of Auburn, NY
Mike Quill, one of the founders of the Transport Workers Union of America (TWU), a subway workers union
Peter Quill (footballer) (b. 1969), Australian athlete
Timothy Quill, Irish politician
Timothy E. Quill, American physician

Fictional characters 

 Peter Quill, birth name of Star-Lord, a superhero from Marvel Comics
 Quill, codename of Maxwell Jordan, a character from X-Men comics

English-language surnames